Oxnam is a village near Jedburgh, in Roxburghshire in the Scottish Borders area of Scotland. It is a primarily residential village.

The placename Oxnam is from Old English oxa (genitive oxan) "oxen" and ham "village", the meaning being "village where ox are bred". The name was recorded as Oxenamm in 1148, and sometimes known as Oxenham.

Current local placenames include Oxnam Green, Oxnam Kirk, Oxnam Mains, Oxnam Neuk, Oxnam Pond, Oxnam Row, Oxnam Sawmill, and Oxnam School.

Dere Street passes through the village. Other places nearby include Bairnkine, Camptown, Crailing, Crailinghall, Hownam, Kelso, Newbigging.

See also
List of places in the Scottish Borders
List of places in Scotland

References

External links

RCAHMS record of Oxnam Parish
RCAHMS/Canmore record for Oxnam churchyard
SCRAN image: Oxnam churchyard, gravestone commemorating William Elliott
Historic Building Recording: Steading Buildings, Swinside Townhead Farm, Oxnam
Oxnam Kirk website

Roxburgh
Villages in the Scottish Borders
Parishes in Roxburghshire